Takashachia is a monotypic moth genus in the subfamily Lymantriinae. Its only species, Takashachia maculosa, is found in Taiwan. Both the genus and the species were first described by Shōnen Matsumura in 1929.

References

Lymantriinae
Monotypic moth genera
Taxa named by Shōnen Matsumura